Portland was a railway station on the Portland Branch Railway in the south of the English county of Dorset. The station opened with the Easton and Church Hope Railway, one of the constituent parts of a complex line, on 16 October 1865. The station was moved to a new site on the opening of the extension to Easton on 1 September 1902.

After this, the old station was used as a goods station and depot. The extension was technically a separate railway, the Easton and Church Hope, although the branch was operated as one line throughout. The second Portland station had multiple platforms with canopies for the large staff of the Admiralty establishments around it.

The station closed to passengers in 1952, although regular freight kept the line in use until 1965. The platforms and canopies survived until the mid-1970s when the site was absorbed by the base and demolished.

References

Further reading 

 
 Station on navigable O.S. map

Disused railway stations in Dorset
Former Weymouth and Portland Railway stations
Railway stations in Great Britain opened in 1865
Railway stations in Great Britain opened in 1902
Railway stations in Great Britain closed in 1952